This is a list of American football quarterbacks who have started for the Boston College Eagles football team and the years they participated on the Boston College Eagles football team.

Starting quarterbacks

Lists of college football quarterbacks

Massachusetts sports-related lists